Mei Sheng (lit. "Beautiful Life" or "Born in the USA"; born August 19, 2003) is a male giant panda born at the San Diego Zoo.  He is the second panda to be born at the zoo and is the first offspring of Bai Yun and Gao Gao.  He is the half-brother of Hua Mei and the brother of Su Lin, Zhen Zhen, Yun Zi, and Xiao Liwu.

Mei Sheng was sent to China on November 5, 2007.  He was reported to have arrived safely at the Wolong National Nature Reserve on November 8, 2007.

After the 2008 Sichuan earthquake, Mei Sheng was relocated to Bifengxia Panda Base, just outside Ya'an, where in May 2009 he successfully copulated with a female giant panda, Ying Ying. Ying Ying's  female cub, born August 26, and named Shu Qing, was sired by either Mei Sheng or another male, Lu Lu.

References

External links
 San Diego Zoo Giant Panda Research Station

Individual giant pandas
2003 animal births
San Diego Zoo